Sir Robert Inigo Tasker, TD, DL, JP (20 October 186828 February 1959) was a British architect and Conservative politician.

Architecture
Robert was the son of George Tasker, and following education at Ardingly College he joined his father's architectural practice in 1892. He became senior partner in the firm in 1916. He was a member of the Institute of Registered Architects and was on the council of the Architects Registration Council of the United Kingdom.

Military service
Tasker held a commission in the British Army Volunteer and Territorial Forces between 1900 and 1920. He was appointed a second lieutenant in the 21st Middlesex Rifle Volunteers in 1900. In 1908 the unit became the 11th Battalion of the London Regiment (Finsbury Rifles). Following the outbreak of war, he reached the rank of major in 1916.

Politics
He was elected to the London County Council in March 1910, representing Holborn as a member of the majority Municipal Reform Party, which was allied to the parliamentary Conservative Party. He resigned his seat in October 1914 when he entered active military service, returning to the council at the 1922 election. He remained a member of the council until 1937 and served as chairman between 1930 and 1931. He was knighted in 1931 at the end of his term of office. In October 1935 he was granted the freedom of the Metropolitan Borough of Holborn. He was also a member of three livery companies of the City of London: the Paviors, Fan Makers and Gardeners.

Tasker was an unsuccessful Conservative candidate at the 1923 general election, when he failed to be elected at Bethnal Green North East. Another election was held in 1924, and Tasker stood again, this time at Islington East. In a three-cornered contest, Tasker defeated the sitting Liberal Member of Parliament (MP), Arthur Comyns Carr. Five years later he was defeated when a swing to Labour saw Ethel Bentham, one of his opponents in 1924, take the seat.

In 1935 he was selected as Conservative candidate for the Holborn constituency. Duly elected, Tasker was on the right wing of the Conservative Party, and frequently found himself at odds with the wartime National Government.

The life of the parliament elected in 1935 was extended to ten years due to the Second World War. Tasker had been confirmed as parliamentary candidate by Holborn Conservative Association in October 1944. However, in February 1945 Max Aitken was adopted as candidate for the upcoming general election. Tasker described the situation as "quite irregular" as he had had no intention of withdrawing his candidature. However he did not contest the election, effectively retiring from politics.

Death
Sir Robert Tasker died, aged 90, on 28 February 1959. His funeral was held at Hawkinge Crematorium, Folkestone on 6 March.

References

External links 
 

1868 births
1959 deaths
People educated at Ardingly College
Conservative Party (UK) MPs for English constituencies
UK MPs 1924–1929
UK MPs 1935–1945
Members of London County Council
London Regiment officers
Deputy Lieutenants of the County of London
Knights Bachelor
Volunteer Force officers in Middlesex units
British Army personnel of World War I
Municipal Reform Party politicians
English justices of the peace